Rocío Adelita Sosa Gudiel (born 24 August 1990) is a Guatemalan retired footballer who played as a midfielder. She has been a member of the Guatemala women's national team.

International career
Sosa capped for Guatemala at senior level during the 2010 Central American and Caribbean Games, the 2010 CONCACAF Women's World Cup Qualifying and the 2012 CONCACAF Women's Olympic Qualifying Tournament (and its qualification).

References

1990 births
Living people
Guatemalan women's footballers
Guatemala women's international footballers
Women's association football midfielders